Events from the year 1926 in Sweden

Incumbents
 Monarch – Gustaf V
 Prime Minister – Rickard Sandler, Carl Gustaf Ekman

Events

 6–14 February – The Nordic Games take place in Stockholm.

Births

 24 April – Thorbjörn Fälldin, politician
 21 May – Gustaf Lindh, modern pentathlete

Exact date missing
 Lars Ardelius, psychologist and novelist.
 Hans Granlid,  novelist and literary historian (died 1999).
 Rita Tornborg,  novelist and short story writer.

Deaths
 14 May – Adolf Bergman, tug-of-war competitor (born 1879).
 23 May – Sigrid Elmblad, writer and translator (born 1860)
 26 July – Olle Lanner, gymnast (born 1884).
 Wilhelmina Skogh
 Ellen Key
 Olga Sandberg

References

 
Sweden
Years of the 20th century in Sweden